Thomas Boden  (born June 1860) was a Welsh footballer. He was part of the Wales national football team, playing 1 match on 15 March 1880 against England.

At club level, he played for Wrexham from 1879–1880. He played as a right wing in the 1879 Welsh Cup Final, where his team lost against Newtown White Star with 1–0.

Honours

Wrexham

Welsh Cup
Runners-up:1878-79

See also
 List of Wales international footballers (alphabetical)

References

1860 births
Welsh footballers
Wales international footballers
Wrexham A.F.C. players
Place of birth missing
Date of death missing
Year of death missing
Association football wingers